Paracles discalis is a moth of the subfamily Arctiinae first described by Reich in 1933. It is found in Ecuador.

References

Moths described in 1933
Paracles